Lastva Grbaljska is a village in the municipality of Kotor, Montenegro.The population of this small village is constantly moving to cities like Budva and Kotor.
During the First World War, Serbian Army liberated the village from the Austria Hungary.
in the Second World War the small village was under the control of Chetniks until 1944 when Yugoslav partisans came to the village and killed over 100 Serbs and over 200 Chetniks.
in 1979 Lastva Grbaljska was hit with the destructive earthquake.
in 1999 during the NATO bombing of Yugoslavia 3 bombs were dropped near the village, there were no civil or military casualties. in 2020 during the 2019-2020 clerical protests in Montenegro 70,000 Serbs came to the Podlastva Monastery that was located in the village.

Demographics
According to the 2011 census, its population was 530.

References

Populated places in Kotor Municipality